Hospital General is a metro station along Line 3 of the Mexico City Metro. It is  located in the Cuauhtémoc borough of Mexico City.

General information
This station transfers to the "S" trolleybus line, which runs between ISSSTE Zaragoza and Chapultepec.

Hospital General serves passengers in the Colonias (neighborhoods) of Doctores and Roma. The station opened on 20 November 1970 when it served as the southern terminus of Line 3.  Service southward towards Centro Médico started 10 years later on 7 June 1980.

Name and iconography
The station logo represents the symbol of International Red Cross. Its name refers to the General Hospital of Mexico, which is located above the station.

Ridership

References

External links 

Hospital General
Mexico City Metro stations in Cuauhtémoc, Mexico City
Railway stations opened in 1970
1970 establishments in Mexico
Accessible Mexico City Metro stations